Stuart Price (born 1977) is a British electronic musician.

Stuart Price may also refer to:

 Stuart Hetley Price (1922–1977), English bishop
 Stu Price, character in The Hangover Trilogy
 Stuart Price (photographer) (born 1971), English photographer
 Stuart Matthew Price (born 1983), British actor and singer